Alaaddin Okumuş (born 23 August 1995) is a Turkish professional footballer who plays as a right-back for Süper Lig club Sivasspor.

Professional career
A youth product of Gençlerbirliği, Okumuş began his career with Kastamonuspor on loan from Hacettepe. He returned to Gençlerbirliği, where he went on short loans to Ankaragücü and Hacettepe before transferring to Ümraniyespor in the TFF First League.

He signed a professional contract with Sivasspor on 18 January 2021. Okumuş made his professional debut with Sivasspor in a 4-1 Süper Lig win over Ankaragücü on 7 February 2021. In July 2021, Okumuş was loaned out to TFF First League club Samsunspor for the 2021-22 season.

References

External links
 
 

1995 births
Living people
Sportspeople from Ankara
Turkish footballers
Turkey youth international footballers
Gençlerbirliği S.K. footballers
Hacettepe S.K. footballers
MKE Ankaragücü footballers
Sivasspor footballers
Samsunspor footballers
Süper Lig players
TFF First League players
TFF Second League players
Association football fullbacks
Ümraniyespor footballers